Gelsey Kirkland (born December 29, 1952) is an American ballerina. She received early ballet training at the School of American Ballet. Kirkland joined the New York City Ballet in 1968 at age 15, at the invitation of George Balanchine. She was promoted to soloist in 1969, and principal in 1972. She went on to create leading roles in many of the great twentieth century ballets by Balanchine, Jerome Robbins, and Antony Tudor, including Balanchine's revival of The Firebird, Robbins' Goldberg Variations, and Tudor's The Leaves are Fading. Balanchine re-choreographed his version of Stravinsky's The Firebird specifically for her. She left the New York City Ballet to join the American Ballet Theatre in 1974 as a principal dancer.

Kirkland is perhaps most famous to the general public for dancing the role of Clara Stahlbaum in Baryshnikov's 1977 televised production of The Nutcracker. She left the American Ballet Theatre in 1984.

Personal life 
Kirkland was born December 29, 1952, in Bethlehem, Pennsylvania. Her father, Jack Kirkland, was a playwright who penned the Broadway adaptations of Tobacco Road and Tortilla Flat. Her mother, Nancy Hoardley, was an actress. Her sister, Johnna Kirkland, also studied at the School of American Ballet and danced with the New York City Ballet.

Gelsey Kirkland currently lives in Maine with her second husband, dancer, choreographer, and teacher Michael Chernov, who was also with ABT. In 2006, she was awarded the Dance Magazine Award.

Career 
While at the New York City Ballet from 1968-1974, Kirkland performed as a soloist and principal dancer in several ballets including Concerto Barocco, The Cage, Irish Fantasy, Symphony in C, La Source, Theme and Variations, Tarantella, Harlequinade, The Nutcracker, and Dances at a Gathering.

After joining the American Ballet Theatre in 1974, she performed as a principal dancer in a number of classical ballets including the title role in Giselle, Kitri in Don Quixote, Clara in The Nutcracker, Swanilda in Coppélia, Aurora in The Sleeping Beauty, Juliet in Romeo and Juliet, the Sylph in La Sylphide, Lise in La Fille Mal Gardée, Odette/Odile in Swan Lake, Nikiya in The Kingdom of the Shades, the Mazurka and pas de deux in Les Sylphides, and the Sleepwalker in La Sonnambula.

Kirkland was repeatedly fired (but always rehired) by American Ballet Theatre for drug abuse and erratic behavior. It was her partner Patrick Bissell who had introduced her to cocaine, which the two did together. Kirkland said many of the dancers in the company were doing all kinds of drugs to cope with the pressures of dancing. She became a prima ballerina.

Kirkland was featured on the May 1, 1978, cover of Time.

In 1986, Kirkland retired from performing, becoming a ballet teacher, choreographer, and coach.

In 2007, Kirkland choreographed (with Chernov and ABT artistic director Kevin McKenzie) a new production of Tchaikovsky's The Sleeping Beauty, in which, after an absence from the stage of more than 20 years, she danced the role of "Carabosse, the Wicked Fairy".

In 2010, Kirkland and Chernov established the Gelsey Kirkland Academy of Classical Ballet (GKACB), where they served as co-Artistic Directors. The Gelsey Kirkland Academy of Classical Ballet was accompanied by the Gelsey Kirkland Ballet company. The ballet company presented classical ballets in New York City. The company closed in 2021.

Books
Kirkland's first autobiography, Dancing on My Grave (1986), written with her then-husband Greg Lawrence, was a memoir chronicling her artistic transformation from George Balanchine's "baby ballerina" to one of the more acclaimed ballerinas of her generation. The book describes in detail her struggles with her domestic family problems, sibling rivalry, anorexia, bulimia, plastic surgeries, drug addiction, her quest for artistic perfection, and her complicated love affairs with Mikhail Baryshnikov and numerous other men, most of whom she encountered in the ballet world. Dancing on My Grave was dedicated to Joseph Duell, a dancer with the New York City Ballet who had committed suicide that same year, in 1986, in hopes "that the cry for help might yet be heard".

Kirkland's second autobiography, The Shape of Love (1990), dealt with her move to England to dance with The Royal Ballet, her attempts to get a fresh start with her first husband, and her return to American Ballet Theatre with a clean slate and a renewed outlook on life.

Kirkland and her husband eventually collaborated again on a children's book, The Little Ballerina and Her Dancing Horse (1993), about a little girl who loves ballet but might not be able to keep dancing if she keeps riding her horse Sugar.

References

Bibliography

External links
 
 

American ballerinas
American expatriates in Australia
American expatriates in the United Kingdom
1952 births
Living people
People from Bethlehem, Pennsylvania
New York City Ballet principal dancers
American Ballet Theatre principal dancers
Principal dancers of The Royal Ballet
Prima ballerinas
School of American Ballet alumni